D Line may refer to:

Transportation 
Line D (Buenos Aires Underground), an underground line in Buenos Aires, Argentina
 D Line (Los Angeles Metro), a rapid transit line in Los Angeles County, California
Line D (Prague Metro), a subway route in Prague, the Czech Republic
Line D (Rome Metro), potential line of the Rome Metro system
D Line (RTD), a light rail line in Denver
Green Line D branch, a light rail line in Boston
D (New York City Subway service), a subway route in New York
RapidRide D Line, a bus route in Seattle, Washington, United States
D Line (Minnesota), a planned rapid bus line in Minneapolis, Minnesota, United States
D (Los Angeles Railway), a former streetcar line in Los Angeles, California

Other uses
D-line, Port Harcourt, a neighborhood in Port Harcourt, Nigeria
D-line (IRC), a command in IRCd
D-line, a spectral line of the Fraunhofer lines

See also
D Train (disambiguation)